Frémontiers is a commune in the Somme department in Hauts-de-France in northern France.

Geography
The commune is situated 15 miles (25 km) southwest of Amiens on the junction of the D138 and D920 roads

Population

Places of interest
 The church
 The watermill
 Frémontiers woods

See also
Communes of the Somme department
Jacques Frémontier (born surname Friedman; 1930–2020), French journalist and television producer

References

Communes of Somme (department)